Drew Hardin (born 18 October 2004) is an American soccer player who plays as a midfielder for MLS Next Pro club Inter Miami CF II.

Career
Hardin began his career with U.S. Soccer Development Academy clubs Boca United and South Florida Football Academy before joining the youth academy at Inter Miami. On 9 April 2021, Hardin was announced as part of the reserve side of Inter Miami, Inter Miami CF II, as an academy registered player. Hardin then made his debut for Fort Lauderdale on 10 April during their opening match against the New England Revolution II, starting in a 1–0 defeat.

Career statistics

References

External links
 Profile at Fort Lauderdale CF

2004 births
Living people
American soccer players
Association football midfielders
Inter Miami CF II players
USL League One players
Footballers from Cambridgeshire
Sportspeople from Cambridge
Sportspeople from Boca Raton, Florida
Soccer players from Florida
MLS Next Pro players